Leigh Baker (born 20 September 1951) is an Australian former cricketer. He played five first-class cricket matches for Victoria between 1975 and 1976.

See also
 List of Victoria first-class cricketers

References

External links
 

1951 births
Living people
Australian cricketers
Victoria cricketers
Cricketers from Melbourne